The 2000–01 Alabama–Huntsville Chargers ice hockey team represented the University of Alabama in Huntsville in the 2000–01 NCAA Division I men's ice hockey season. The Chargers were coached by Doug Ross who was in his nineteenth season as head coach. The Chargers played their home games in the Von Braun Center and were members of the College Hockey America conference.

Roster

|}

Season

Schedule

|-
!colspan=12 style=""| Regular Season

|-
!colspan=12 style=""| CHA Tournament

Standings

Statistics

Skaters

Goalies

References

Alabama Huntsville
Alabama–Huntsville Chargers men's ice hockey seasons
Ala